Hedemora church (Swedish: Hedemora kyrka) is a church in Hedemora, Sweden. The date of the building is unknown but it was first mentioned in 1362.

References

Buildings and structures in Hedemora Municipality